is a railway station located in the city of Tōkamachi, Niigata, operated jointly by the East Japan Railway Company (JR East) and the third sector Hokuetsu Express.

Lines
It is also a station for the Hokuhoku Line and is located 15.9 kilometers from the terminus of the line at Muikamachi Station.

Station layout
The JR portion of the station has a single side platform and island platforms serving three ground-level tracks connected by a footbridge. The station has a Midori no Madoguchi staffed ticket office. The Hokuetsu Express portion of the station has a single elevated island platform serving two tracks.

JR East

Hokuetsu Express

History
Tōkamachi Station opened on 15 November 1927. Following the privatization of Japanese National Railways (JNR) on 1 April 1987, the station came under the control of JR East.

Passenger statistics
In fiscal 2017, the station was used by an average of 505 passengers daily (boarding passengers only).

Surrounding area

 Tōkamachi City Hospital

See also
List of railway stations in Japan

References

External links

JR East Tōkamachi Station
Hokuetsu Express Tōkamachi Station

Railway stations in Niigata Prefecture
Iiyama Line
Stations of Hokuetsu Express
Railway stations in Japan opened in 1927
Tōkamachi, Niigata